The following lists events that happened during 2015 in the Republic of Belarus.

Incumbents
 President: Alexander Lukashenko
 Prime Minister: Andrei Kobyakov

Events

January
 January 1 - The Eurasian Economic Union came into effect, creating a political and economic union between Russia, Belarus, Armenia and Kazakhstan.

October
 October 11 - The next presidential election will take place.

References

 
2010s in Belarus
Years of the 21st century in Belarus
Belarus
Belarus